Rumiani Rural District is a rural district (dehestan) in the Suri District of Rumeshkhan County, Lorestan Province, Iran. At the 2006 census, it had 8,068 inhabitants living in 1,635 households.  The rural district has nine villages:
 Aliabad Nazar Alivand
 Hoseynabad
 Musaabad-e Olya
 Musaabad-e Sofla
 Padarvand-e Olya
 Padarvand-e Sofla
 Padarvand-e Vosta
 Papiabad Kalivand
 Rumiani

Notes and references 

Rumeshkhan County
Rural Districts of Lorestan Province